Øystein Greni (born 15 June 1974 in Oslo) is the singer and lead guitar player of the Norwegian rock and roll band BigBang.

Biography
Øystein Greni is the son of Thor Sigbjørn Greni, singer and songwriter of the Undertakers Circus, a 60/70s soul band. In 1992, Greni, Erik Tresselt and Christer Engen formed Bigbang which has since established its position as one of the principal rock acts of Norway. As the only consistent member throughout the band's history, Bigbang's success is often attributed to Greni's skills as a guitarist and songwriter.

Greni also works as a music producer. In 2003, he produced the EP debut of Latin performer Maria Orieta (Greni's fiancée) Buenos Aires via the Grandsport Records indie label.

Greni is also a former skateboarding champion, having won the 1991 European Skateboard amateur championship in Antwerp.
In 2007 Greni and the band relocated to U.S.A.

Discography 

Within BigBang
1995: Waxed (Grand Sport Records)
1999: Electric Psalmbook (Grand Sport Records)
2000: Clouds Rolling By (Warner Elektra Atlantic)
2002: Frontside Rock'n'Roll (Warner Music Norway)
2003: Radio Radio TV Sleep (Grand Sport Records), live record
2005: Poetic Terrorism (Grand Sport Records)
2007: Too Much Yang (Grand Sport Records/Warner Music Norway)
2008: From Acid to Zen (Oglio Records)
2009: Edendale (Oglio Records)
2011: Epic Scrap Metal (Grand Sport Records)
2013: The Oslo Bowl (Warner Music)
2019: Glory Chord

References

External links 
TV-aksjonen 2011: "Fields of Fire" on NRK 2011

1974 births
Living people
Norwegian rock guitarists
Norwegian rock singers
Norwegian songwriters
21st-century Norwegian singers
21st-century Norwegian guitarists
21st-century Norwegian male singers
Bigbang (Norwegian band) members